The 1990 Campeonato Brasileiro Série A was the 34th edition of the Campeonato Brasileiro Série A.

Overview
It was contested by 20 teams, and Corinthians won the championship.
Relegated: Sao Jose and Inter de Limeira.

Format 
The tournament will be played in a double round-robin system.
For the determination of the quarterfinalists the 20 Teams is divided into 2 groups.
The best team of each group considering only results within the group and the best team of each group considering only results with teams from the other group alongside the 4 best placed teams in the overall table advance to the quarterfinals. 
The bottom two teams will be relegated.

First stage

Quarterfinals

Semifinals

Finals

Final standings

References

1990
1